The Luther Winslow Jr. House is a historic house located at 5225 North Main Street in Fall River, Massachusetts.

Description and history 
Built in 1795, the -story farmhouse is a fine example of 18th century vernacular architecture which has remained remarkably intact. Typical features include the 5-bay wide plan, large central chimney, clapboard sheathing, pilasters framing the center door, transom lights, 12/12 sash, corner boards and wide entablature. It is one of six houses in the Steep Brook area considered to be the best representatives of the pre-industrial period of the city's history.

It was added to the National Register of Historic Places on February 16, 1983.

See also
National Register of Historic Places listings in Fall River, Massachusetts

References

Houses completed in 1795
Houses in Fall River, Massachusetts
National Register of Historic Places in Fall River, Massachusetts
Houses on the National Register of Historic Places in Bristol County, Massachusetts
Federal architecture in Massachusetts